Henry Lambert (died 1813) was an officer of the British Royal Navy.

Henry Lambert may also refer to:
Henry Lambert (MP) for County Wexford (UK Parliament constituency)
Sir Henry Lambert, 5th Baronet, High Sheriff of Oxfordshire
Henry Lambert of the Lambert baronets
Harry Lambert (1918–1995), Australian footballer and cricketer